Elspeth McLachlan  (born 22 July 1942), an Australian neuroscientist, is a world authority on neural pathways within the autonomic nervous system. Her work has included detailed analyses of transmission in autonomic ganglia to studies of the organisation of autonomic nervous pathways and their disorder in pathological states, particularly injuries to peripheral nerves and the spinal cord.

McLachlan was born in Bowral, New South Wales, Australia.

Education 
McLachlan was educated at the University of Sydney, from which institution she received Bachelor of Science degree in 1962, and a PhD in 1973, and a Doctor of Science degree in 1994.

Career 

1985–1993 – Visiting Professor, Christian-Albrechts-Universität zu Kiel, Germany
1987–1988 – National Health and Medical Research Council Principal Research Fellow and Associate Professor, School of Physiology and Pharmacology, University of New South Wales, Australia
1988–1993 – Professor and Head, Department of Physiology & Pharmacology, University of Queensland, Australia 
1993–2011 – Senior Principal Research Fellow, Prince of Wales Medical Research Institute, Randwick, Australia 
1999–2001 – Executive Head, Centre for Research Management, National Health & Medical Research Council, Canberra, Australia 
2000–2003 – Investigador Asociado, Instituto de Neurociencias, Universidad Miguel Hernández, Alicante, Spain 
2001–2006 – Pro-Vice Chancellor (Research) and Research Professor, University of New South Wales, Australia 
2007–present – Emeritus Professor, University of New South Wales, Australia

Honours and awards 

2009: Honorary Member, Australasian Neuroscience Society 
2009: Honorary Member, Australian Physiological Society 
2006: Distinguished Achievement Award, Australasian Neuroscience Society 
2003: Centenary Medal for contribution to the Australian community and science in medical research  
1998: Ramaciotti Medal for Excellence in Biomedical Research 
1997: Elected Fellow, Australian Academy of Science 
1996, 1999: Invitation Fellowship, Japan Society for the Promotion of Science
1995 Orbeli Medal, Armenian Academy of Neuroscience 
1993: Max-Planck-Research Prize (Max-Planck-Forschungspreis) for international collaborative research (with W. Jänig)
The Australasian Neuroscience Society announced the establishment of an annual Elspeth McLachlan Plenary Lecture in 2017.

Selected publications 

Tripovic, D., Pianova, S., McLachlan, E.M. and Brock, J.A. (2011) Slow and incomplete sympathetic reinnervation of rat tail artery restores the amplitude of nerve-evoked contractions provided a perivascular plexus is present.  AJP Heart and Circulatory Physiology 300, H541-554

References

External links 
 Transcript of interview with Professor David Hirst (2000)

Living people
1942 births
Australian neuroscientists
University of Sydney alumni
Academic staff of the University of New South Wales
Academic staff of the University of Queensland
Australian women neuroscientists
Fellows of the Australian Academy of Science
People from Bowral